"Whatever We Want" is a song by Australian DJ and recording artist Havana Brown.

"Whatever We Want" was released digitally on 27 March 2014. In Australia, the track debuted and peaked at number thirty-five on the ARIA Singles Chart, and thirteen on the ARIA Dance Singles Chart.

Background and reception
"Whatever We Want" was written by Brown together with Richard Vission, Luciana Caporaso, Nick Clow, Ricky Luna and Myah Langston. Vission also produced the recording and Trevor Muzzy was responsible for the song's mixing. Recorded in Los Angeles during her tour in the United States, "Whatever We Want" samples Basement Jaxx's 2001 song "Where's Your Head At", which itself samples Gary Numan's track "M.E.". "Whatever We Want" was released digitally via iTunes Stores on 27 March 2014, as a stand-alone single.

On the week of 3 April 2014, "Whatever We Want" was the number one most added track on Australian radio. The single debuted and peaked on the Australian ARIA Singles Chart at number thirty-five on 7 April 2014, making it her eighth song to enter the top 100 and sixth top 40 chart appearance. The recording also debuted on the Australian ARIA Dance Chart at its peak, number thirteen.

Formats and track listings

Charts

Weekly charts

Release history

References

2014 singles
Havana Brown (musician) songs
2014 songs
Island Records singles
Songs written by Luciana Caporaso
Songs written by Nick Clow
Songs written by Havana Brown (musician)